Capnura is a genus of small winter stoneflies in the family Capniidae. There are about seven described species in Capnura.

Species
These seven species belong to the genus Capnura:
 Capnura anas Nelson & Baumann, 1987
 Capnura elevata (Frison, 1942)
 Capnura fibula (Claassen, 1924)
 Capnura intermontana Nelson & Baumann, 1987
 Capnura manitoba (Claassen, 1924) (Manitoba snowfly)
 Capnura venosa Banks, 1900
 Capnura wanica (Frison, 1944)

References

Further reading

 
 

Plecoptera
Articles created by Qbugbot